Meetei Mayek is a Unicode block containing characters for writing the Meitei language of Manipur, India.

History
The following Unicode-related documents record the purpose and process of defining specific characters in the Meetei Mayek block:

References 

Meitei script
Unicode blocks